Charles Lagrange Prize, or Prix Charles Lagrange, is a monetary prize, recognizing the best mathematical or experimental work contributing to the progress of mathematical knowledge in the world.  It was first awarded in 1952 by the Académie Royale de Belgique, Classe des Sciences.  Recipients may be Belgian or foreign.

Recipients 
The recipients of the Charles Lagrange Prize are:

 2012: Aida Alvera-Azcárate
 2008: Frederik J. Simons
 2000: Viviane Pierrard
 2000: Louis François
 1992: Christian Tricot
 1992: Salim Djenidi
 1988: Véronique Dehant
 1984: André Berger
 1980: Augustinus Nolet
 1976: Carlo Denis
 1972: Desmond King-Hele
 1968: R.O. Vicente
 1964: Hitoshi Takeuchi
 1960: Jean Verbaandert
 1960: Paul Melchior
 1956: Jean Coulomb
 1952: Beno Gutenberg
 1948: Harold Jeffreys
 1944: Georges Jean Maury
 1932: William Bowie

See also

 List of mathematics awards

References 

International awards
Mathematics awards
Awards established in 1952
Belgian awards